Ryan Wayne Donowho (born September 20, 1980) is an American actor and musician.

Early life
Born and raised in Houston, Texas, Donowho appeared as an uncredited extra in "Varsity Blues (film)", a film shot in his home state of Texas. Donowho moved to Brooklyn, New York and then to Los Angeles. He was a street musician in New York City as a "bucket" drummer. Donowho was bucket drumming in New York City when he was discovered by a modeling agent. He has an older brother, Matthew and a younger brother, Joseph.

Career
His official movie debut was in 2001's The Car Thief and the Hit Man. Donowho co-starred alongside Emile Hirsch in The Mudge Boy. In 2003 he was featured as the drummer for a song in The Hermitt's "& The Story of The Insects". Donowho is known for his work in 2004's Imaginary Heroes with Emile Hirsch. In the film, Donowho plays a sexually ambiguous character.

Donowho's roles in Imaginary Heroes and later in A Home at the End of the World created for Donowho a positive relationship with the gay community. He appeared with brother Matthew at the 2004 Outfest, a gay and lesbian film festival held annually in Los Angeles along with the cast and crew of A Home at the End of the World. He appeared in Bringing Rain with Rodrigo Lopresti and Alexis Dziena. For the third season of The O.C., the producers cast Donowho as Johnny Harper. Donowho played Stanley in the 2006 film adaptation of Strangers With Candy but does not appear in the released version of the film.

Donowho appeared in the thriller film Altitude. He played the lead character of Nathan in Rites of Passage.

Filmography

Awards
Donowho is the recipient of several awards; he was awarded twice  for his role in the 2006 film The Favor at the San Diego Film Festival, receiving the Festival Award, and the Achievement in Acting Award, both for Best Actor. For his portrayal in the 2016 film Salvation, he was received the award for Best Actor at the Los Angeles Cinema Festival of Hollywood.

References

External links
 

1980 births
American drummers
American male film actors
American male television actors
Living people
Male actors from Houston
Musicians from Houston
Male actors from Los Angeles
Musicians from Los Angeles
21st-century American drummers